Marquess of Villena is a hereditary title in the Peerage of Spain, granted in 1445 by John II to Juan Pacheco, Grand Master of the Order of Santiago and later also 1st Duke of Escalona.

It was originally founded as a seigniory in the thirteenth century by Ferdinand III of Castile for his youngest son, Don Manuel. In 1369, the estate was elevated to a marquisate, the first such designation in Castile, and awarded to Don Alfonso of Aragorn. However, the title was not hereditary and in 1395 it reverted back to the crown of Castile. From that point, Villena had a complicated history of awards and reversions back to the crown until John II granted it as a hereditary title to Juan Pacheco in 1445. It was the first time the Marquisate was held outside of royalty.

The 8th marquess, Juan Manuel Fernández Pacheco, founded the Royal Spanish Academy.

Marquesses of Villena

 Juan Pacheco, 1st Marquess of Villena (1419–1474)
 Diego Lopez de Pacheco, 2nd Marquess of Villena (1456–1529)
 Diego López Pacheco, 3rd Marquess of Villena (1506–1556)
 Francisco Pacheco, 4th Marquess of Villena (1532–1574)
 Juan Fernández Pacheco, 5th Marquess of Villena (1563–1615)
 Felipe Fernández Pacheco, 6th Marquess of Villena (1596–1633)
 Diego López Pacheco, 7th Marquess of Villena (1599–1653)
 Juan Manuel López de Pacheco, 8th Marquess of Villena (1650–1725)
 Mercurio López Pacheco, 9th Marquess of Villena (1679–1738)
 Andrés Fernández Pacheco, 10th Marquess of Villena (1710–1746)
 Juan López Pacheco, 10th Marquess of Villena (1746–1751) 
 Felipe Lopez-Pacheco de La Cueva, 12th Marquess of Villena (1727–1798)
 Diego López Pacheco y Téllez-Girón, 13th Marquess of Villena (1754–1811)    
 Bernardino Fernández de Velasco, 14th Marquess of Villena (1783–1851)    
 Francisco de Borja de Martorell y Téllez-Girón, 15th Marquess of Villena (1839–1897) 
 Mariano Tellez-Giron y Fernandez de Cordoba, 16th Marquess of Villena (1887–1931)    
 Gabino de Martorell y Téllez-Girón, 17th Marquess of Villena (1894–1918)    
 María de La Soledad de Martorell y Castillejo, 18th Marchioness of Villena (1924–)
 Ángela María Téllez-Girón y Duque de Estrada, 19th Marchioness of Villena (1961 –1966)   
 Francisco de Borja de Soto y Martorell, 20th Marquess of Villea (1966–1997)    
 Francisco de Borja de Soto y Moreno-Santamaría, 21st Marquess of Villena

See also
Spanish nobility

References

Marquesses of Spain
Lists of Spanish nobility
Noble titles created in 1445